Blind Ambition is a four-part American miniseries that aired on CBS from May 20, 1979 to May 23, 1979 focusing on the Watergate coverup and based on the memoirs of former White House counsel John Dean and his wife Maureen.

Producer Renee Valente earned an Emmy nomination for the series.

Part I ranked as the 15th most-watched show for the week of May 14–20, 1979, and Parts IV, II, and III, respectively, ranked as the 11th-13th most watched primetime shows of the following week.

Cast

 Martin Sheen as John Dean, Nixon White House counsel and coordinator of the Watergate cover-up turned star witness
 Rip Torn as President Richard Nixon
 Theresa Russell as Maureen Dean
 William Daniels as G. Gordon Liddy, former FBI agent, one of the head White House Plumbers and one of the Watergate Seven
 Graham Jarvis as John Ehrlichman, Nixon chief domestic advisor
 John Randolph as John Mitchell, former Attorney General
 Lawrence Pressman as H.R. "Bob" Haldeman, Nixon White House Chief of Staff
 Ed Flanders as Charlie Shaffer, Dean's lawyer
 Peter Mark Richman as Robert Mardian, political CRP coordinator
 James Sloyan as Ronald Ziegler, Nixon White House press secretary
 William Windom as Richard Kleindienst, Attorney General succeeding Mitchell
 Lonny Chapman as L. Patrick Gray, acting FBI director
 Christopher Guest as Jeb Stuart Magruder, CRP coordinator turned witness
 James Karen as Earl Silbert, federal prosecutor
 Kip Niven as Egil "Bud" Krogh, Nixon executive assistant who worked with the White House Plumbers
 Michael Callan as Charles Colson, Nixon White House counsel preceding Dean
 David Sheiner as Samuel Dash, Georgetown law professor and chief counsel to the Senate Watergate Committee

References

External links
 

1979 television films
1979 films
1970s American television miniseries
CBS network films
American biographical series
Works about the Watergate scandal
Films set in Washington, D.C.
1979 American television series debuts
1979 American television series endings
Films directed by George Schaefer
Watergate scandal in film
1970s American films